The Mamasa (Mamasa: To Mamasa) is a community indigenous people residing in Mamasa Regency, West Sulawesi. The Mamasa community is known in districts in Mamasa Regency. The Mamasa people are part of the Toraja sub-people. Mamasa language is similar to Toraja language. The Mamasa people are often referred to as the Toraja Mamasa people.

History 
Folklore tells that "Nene' Torije'ne" (ancestral ancestors) came from the sea and "Grandmother Pongkapadang" (grandfather ancestors) came from the eastern mountains of Sulawesi Island. After they met they moved to Buntu Bulo, in Tabulahan near Mamuju Regency. 

According to researchers, this Mamasa people was originally from the Toraja Sa'dan people who migrated to this area—developing into a community that is now more commonly known as the Mamasa people.

Religion  
In this tribe, the majority faith is Protestant, with a minority Islam and Catholic.

The development of Christianity was accepted by the Mamasa tribe community around the early 1900s as professed by missionaries from the Netherlands. The Mamasa people speak the Mamasa language. The Mamasa language is grouped into the sub-dialect of the Toraja language because there are many language similarities between the Mamasa language and the Toraja language. Mamasa is spoken in the area along the Mamasa river on the border of Mamasa Regency and Polewali Mandar Regency, West Sulawesi.

The ancestral religion is "Ada' Mappurondo" or "Aluk Tomatua". This traditional religious tradition continues to be passed across the generations. The tradition of Ada 'Mappurondo is carried out especially after the rice harvest, in thanksgiving for their harvest. One tradition from the traditional religion of the Mamasa people is unique, namely the burial tradition. The corpse is made to walk by itself to the prepared grave. They believe that all corpses of a family or relative will be in the same place in the afterlife.

Culture

Language 
The Mamasa language has several dialects, namely:
North Mamasa 
Middle Mamasa
Pattae' (South Mamasa, Patta' Binuang, Binuang, Tae', Binuang-Paki-Batetanga-Anteapi)

Custom house  
The Mamasa people have a traditional house that functioned as a residence and for crop storage. The traditional house of the Mamasa tribe is unique. Its shape resembles a ship, like their ancestors' ships when they crossed the sea and settled in this area. The traditional house of the Mamasa people is similar to the traditional house of the Toraja people.

Art  
Mamasa people practice arts that are inherent in their culture such as dances, musical instruments and traditional clothes. 

The three traditional dances are Bulu Londong, Malluya and Burrake. 

A musical instrument owned by the Mamasa community, is the pompang flute. It is made of bamboo and is played by blowing into it and presented in an ensemble form. Traditional clothes for men include pongko clothes and toraya pants, while the women wear woven skirts and carry woven bags.

Tradition
Rambu Solo or mourning parties are not only a sacred tradition for the people of Mamasa Regency, West Sulawesi. The tradition of this death party is also a place to glue the big family of Mamasa's noble lineage together.

To entertain the bereaved families and invited guests who were present, the committee presented a spectacle in the form of a buffalo fight. The buffalo fight in a special arena in Mamasa was carried out until the peak of the funeral was over.

Agriculture 
The Mamasa farm rice, corn, cassava, sweet potatoes, peanuts, green beans, soybeans, vegetables and various types of fruits. They also plant coffee and cocoa in a traditional way. They also raise livestock, such as pigs, buffalo, cows, horses, goats, chickens and ducks. Some are sold to increase family income.

References 

West Sulawesi